The Cabinet Schröder III was the state government of the German state of Lower Saxony from 30 March 1998 until 27 October 1998. The Cabinet was headed by Minister President Gerhard Schröder and was formed by the Social Democratic Party, after Schröder's winning of the 1998 Lower Saxony state election. On 30 March 1998 Schröder was re-elected and sworn in as Minister President by the Landtag of Lower Saxony. 

On 27 October 1998, Gerhard Schröder resigned as Minister President hours before taking office as Chancellor of Germany in October 1998, after his successful win in 1998 German federal election. One member of this cabinet - Funke - was also part of Schröder's first cabinet as Chancellor.

His cabinet was succeeded by his former deputy Gerhard Glogowski, forming the Cabinet Glogowski.

Composition 

|}

Notes

Schröder III
1998 establishments in Germany
1998 disestablishments in Germany
Gerhard Schröder